Jamshidabad (also Romanized as Jamshīdābād) is a village in Sofalgaran Rural District, Lalejin District, Bahar County, Hamadan Province, Iran. At the 2006 census, its population was 188, in 49 families.

References 

Populated places in Bahar County